Ryūsaku, Ryusaku or Ryuusaku (written: 柳作 or 竜策) is a masculine Japanese given name. Notable people with the name include:

, Japanese voice actor
, Japanese academic
, Japanese admiral

Japanese masculine given names